The Hellfire Club is the first novel published by American journalist Jake Tapper.  The book tells the story of a fictitious freshman Congressman, Charlie Marder, as he is introduced into United States politics.  Throughout the story, Marder encounters numerous real-life politicians, including John and Robert F. Kennedy, Lyndon B. Johnson, and Joseph McCarthy.

References 

Novels set in the 1950s
Novels set in Washington, D.C.
Political thriller novels
2018 American novels
Little, Brown and Company books